Upogebia africana is a mud shrimp of the family Upogebiidae. It is endemic to the Atlantic and Indian Ocean coasts of southern Africa and occurs between Langebaan in South Africa and Inhambane in Mozambique.

References

Thalassinidea
Crustaceans described in 1894
Crustaceans of the Atlantic Ocean
Crustaceans of the Indian Ocean
Crustaceans of South Africa
Taxa named by Arnold Edward Ortmann